Nigel Geoffrey Davey (born 20 June 1946) is an English former footballer who played in the Football League for Leeds United.

Career statistics

References

1946 births
Living people
English footballers
Association football defenders
Leeds United F.C. players
Rotherham United F.C. players
English Football League players